Robert Wolski (born 8 December 1982) is a Polish high jumper.

He finished eighth at the 2006 IAAF World Indoor Championships in Moscow. He also competed in the 2004 Olympics, but failed to qualify from his pool.

His personal best jump is 2.31 metres, achieved in September 2006 in Wrocław.

Major competitions record

External links
Official site

1982 births
Living people
Polish male high jumpers
Athletes (track and field) at the 2004 Summer Olympics
Olympic athletes of Poland
People from Łęczyca
Sportspeople from Łódź Voivodeship